General Reid may refer to:

Charles Reid (Indian Army officer) (1818–1901), British East India Company general
Denys Whitehorn Reid (1897–1970), British Indian Army major general
George Reid (soldier) (1733–1815), New Hampshire Militia brigadier general
George Croghan Reid (1876–1961), U.S. Marine Corps brigadier general
John Reid (British Army officer) (1721–1807), British Army general
William Reid (British Army officer) (1791–1858), Corps of Royal Engineers Board of Ordnance major general

See also
Attorney General Reid (disambiguation)
General Read (disambiguation)
General Reed (disambiguation)